Otopheidomenidae is a family of mites in the order Mesostigmata.

Species

Eickwortius Z. Q. Zhang, 1995
 Eickwortius termes Z. Q. Zhang, 1995
Entomoseius Chant, 1965
 Entomoseius dysderci (Evans)
Hemipteroseius Evans, 1963
 Hemipteroseius vikrami Menon, 2011
 Hemipteroseius womersleyi Evans, 1963
Katydiseius Fain & F. S. Lukoschus, 1983
 Katydiseius nadchatrami Fain & F. S. Lukoschus, 1983
Nabiseius Chant & Lindquist, 1965
 Nabiseius duplicisetus Chant & Lindquist, 1965
 Nabiseius melinae Halliday, 1994
 Nabiseius rivnayae Amitai & Swirski, 1980
Orthopteroseius Mo, 1996
 Orthopteroseius sinicus Mo, 1996
Otopheidomenis Treat, 1955
 Otopheidomenis ascalaphae Syed & Goff, 1983
 Otopheidomenis treati (Prasad, 1968)
 Otopheidomenis zalelestes Treat, 1955
Treatia Krantz & Khot, 1962
 Treatia ageneia (Treat, 1965)
 Treatia antillea (Treat, 1965)
 Treatia antilleus (Treat, 1965)
 Treatia ghaiguptaorum Zhang, 1995
 Treatia indica Krantz & Khot, 1962
 Treatia parvula (Treat, 1965)
 Treatia sabbatica (Treat, 1965)

References

Mesostigmata
Acari families